Govt. Degree College Hadipora, Rafiabad is a college, located 9 kilometers away from Sopore in Jammu and Kashmir. This college is one of the 22 colleges approved by the government under a centrally-sponsored scheme called "Establishment of Model Degree Colleges in Educationally Backward Districts" in June 2011. Dr. Gh Nabi Lone is the Principal of the college.

References 

Government universities and colleges in India
Universities and colleges in Jammu and Kashmir
Baramulla district